Thomas Sterner (born November 17, 1956) is an American basketball coach who was an assistant coach for the Toronto Raptors. In August 2015, Sterner joined the University of Central Florida staff as Director of Program Development.

References

External links
NBA.com bio

1956 births
Living people
American expatriate basketball people in Canada
Dallas Mavericks assistant coaches
Franklin & Marshall Diplomats men's basketball coaches
Golden State Warriors assistant coaches
Millersville University of Pennsylvania alumni
Orlando Magic assistant coaches
Toronto Raptors assistant coaches